Gracillaria syringella (lilac leafminer or privet leafminer) is a moth of the family Gracillariidae. It is found in Europe. It has been introduced in North America.

The wingspan is 10–13 mm. The forewings are light yellowbrownish, towards base with whitish and dark fuscous strigulae ; an oblique interrupted fascia about 1/4, a somewhat angulated
median fascia (sometimes followed by a small costal spot), a tornal spot, a spot on costa beyond, and costal and terminal dots near apex white, black-margined ; a blackish discal suffusion beyond middle. Hindwings are rather dark grey.The larva is whitish, sometimes greenish-tinged ; dorsal line darker green ; head brownish-tinged. 

The moth flies in May and again in July depending on the location.

The caterpillars feed on ash (Fraxinus), privet (Ligustrum) and lilac (Syringa)

References

External links
 Lepiforum.de
 

Gracillariinae
Leaf miners
Moths described in 1794
Moths of Europe
Moths of Asia
Taxa named by Johan Christian Fabricius